Tecaxic-Calixtlahuaca was a Mexica settlement, before it was destroyed and conquered by the Otomi and the Spanish conquistadors.

History of Mexico
Aztec sites